S.N. Sinha College, Jehanabad, also Known as Satyendra Narayan Sinha College, established in 1970, is a general degree colleges in Jehanabad, Bihar. It  is affiliated to Magadh University, and offers undergraduate courses in science, commerce and arts.

Departments

Science

Chemistry
Physics
Mathematics
Zoology
Botany

Arts & Commerce 

 English
Hindi
Economics
Political Science
Philosophy
History
Commerce

References

External links
http://snsinhacollege.com/index.php

Colleges affiliated to Magadh University
Universities and colleges in Bihar
Educational institutions established in 1970
1970 establishments in Bihar